Circle K International (CKI) is an international collegiate service organization that is a service leadership program of Kiwanis International. It promotes service, leadership, and fellowship. It has over 13,000 members.

Organization 
Circle K International is a service organization formed to help the community through various service projects. It is part of an umbrella of organizations led by Kiwanis International. Circle K International also aims to build fellowship and create leaders within the membership.

The organization raises funds for various causes. The major initiative is: “Focusing on the Future: Children” which aims to help children of ages six to thirteen.  In 2007, Circle K partnered with the U.S. Fund to help raise $500,000 for UNICEF in efforts to help children around the world who do not have access to clean drinking water.  This is called "Saving Lives – The Six Cents Initiative."  It got its name from the cost in U.S. funds, to purchase one pack of rehydration salts to purify a day's worth of drinking water. Their service partners include UNICEF, Students Team Up to Fight Hunger (STUFH), March of Dimes, Better World Books, Junior Chamber International, and the St. Baldrick's Foundation.

In 2017, Circle K International partnered with UNICEF to adopt the five-year signature project WASH. Circle K International aims to provide education, awareness, and funding to supply clean drinking water and sanitation education to schools and children in Haiti to target Haiti's emergency needs to reach 200,000 people in cholera-affected areas with a complete WASH response package.

Pledge 
"I pledge to uphold the Objects of Circle K International, to foster compassion and goodwill toward others through service and leadership, to develop my abilities and the abilities of all people, and to dedicate myself to the realization of humanity’s potential."

History 
In 1936, the "Circle K House" at Washington State College was established by the Kiwanis Club of Pullman, Washington. Organized as a fraternity, Kappa Iota Phi served men who needed financial aid to attend college. Kiwanians also wanted to provide collegiate students leadership opportunities for their future careers and work service projects to better their communities while having a sense of fellowship.  In 1947, Circle K changed from a fraternity to a service organization. That year, the first Circle K club was chartered at Carthage College in Carthage, Illinois. In 1949, two more clubs were added, and by 1955 there were 147 clubs, at which point Circle K received official endorsement from Kiwanis International.  Circle K International adopted the Kiwanians beliefs by establishing the three tenets of Service, Leadership, and Fellowship to bring a sense of purpose to the organization.

The Kiwanis International Board of Trustees accepted a proposal to allow the establishment of Circle K Districts on February 22, 1957. The very first Circle K District to be officially recognized was the Texas-Oklahoma District. The second Circle K District was Kentucky-Tennessee which was closely followed by Michigan. Four more Districts were added in the 1957–58 administrative year: Missouri-Arkansas, California-Nevada-Hawaii, Ohio, and Alabama.

In 1971, delegates at the International Convention voted to allow women into the organization.  The move was initially met with resistance by Kiwanis, which must approve all changes to the Circle K governing documents. After nearly two years of debate, the Kiwanis International Board of Trustees approved the change on February 6, 1973 and Circle K became the first co-ed organization in the Kiwanis Family. In 1984, Susan E. McClernon was elected the first female International President of Circle K International.

In 1975, Gregory Faulkner from the New York District was elected to the position of International President.  Faulkner was the first African-American International President. Faulkner's election and the admission of female members was symbolic of the new level of maturity and responsibility Circle K International had assumed over 20 years of service, growth and development.

At the International Convention in 1987, the delegates approved the use of the initials CKI as an official name of the organization.  That same year, Kiwanis International voted to allow women into Kiwanis clubs. Key Club had gone co-ed in 1977.

As of the end of 2005, membership consisted of over 13,250 college students in 17 nations around the world.  Most of the Circle K membership currently resides in North America, in 30 Districts recognized by Kiwanis International.  Twenty-seven districts are entirely within the United States, while three districts are international representing Canada and the Caribbean.  These three Districts are the Pacific Northwest (made up of Oregon, Idaho, Washington, and the Canadian province of British Columbia and Yukon Territory), Western Canada (Alberta and Manitoba), and Eastern Canada and the Caribbean.  Districts-in-Formation exist in Eastern Canada, Central and South America, Australia, and the Pacific Rim.

Circle K International celebrated its 50th anniversary at the 2005 International Convention in Greensboro, North Carolina.  The International Convention's theme was, "CKI's 50th Anniversary: 50 Never Looked So Good".

In 2020, due to the COVID-19 pandemic in the United States, the 2019-2020 International Board announced on April 22, 2020 that the upcoming convention in Las Vegas was canceled. The event was rescheduled for July 18, 2020 - July 19, 2020 as the organization's first free virtual conference and had over 955 registered attendees. The International Council convened for a virtual meeting on July 21, 2020 to elect officers for the International Board and to consider amendments to the policy code. In June 2021, due to the continued threat of the pandemic, CKI members were invited to the Kiwanis Education & Leadership Conference in Salt Lake City, Utah instead of holding their own International Convention. Once again, the International Council convened for a meeting to elect officers for the International Board and to consider amendments to the policy code instead of holding the traditional full House of Delegates.

International Conventions (CKIx)

Governance 
CKI operates on a three-tiered system similar to Kiwanis International and Key Club International.  The International Board oversees organizational policy, growth and international expansion.  The International Board is elected at the International Convention held in a different city each summer.  The CKI Board is composed of an International President, Vice-President, and eight trustees who represent assigned districts.  The International Board meets in-person a minimum of four times per year.

The 2022–2023 International Board 

International President:  
Tyler Kearns

International Vice-President: 
Liz Sevigny

International Trustees: 

Trustee: Deanna Fisher 
Districts: Nebraska-Iowa, Ohio, Pacific Northwest, Western Canada

Trustee: Josh Grant-Desir 
Districts: California-Nevada-Hawaii, Florida, Kansas, Louisiana-Mississippi-West Tennessee

Trustee: Zak Kahn 
Districts: Indiana, New Jersey, Eastern Canada

Trustee: Isabelle Lindenmeyer  
Districts: Carolinas, Michigan, Montana, Texas-Oklahoma

Trustee: Shaun Mitchinson 
Districts: New York, Rocky Mountain, Illinois-Eastern Iowa, Utah-Idaho

Trustee: Martin Nguyen 
Districts: Georgia, Kentucky-Tennessee, New England, Pennsylvania

Trustee: Hannah Riley 
Districts: Alabama, Caribbean, Southwest

Trustee: Trudy-Ann Stirling 
Districts: Capital, Minnesota-Dakotas, Missouri-Arkansas, Wisconsin-Upper-Michigan

International Committees 

International Committee Chairs serve Circle K International by being experts in a particular field and running committees to complete tasks that directly affect the membership.

Executive Committee: Tyler Kearns (Chair), Liz Sevigny (Vice-Chair), Zak Kahn (member), Hannah Riley (member), Trudy-Ann Stirling (member) 
Membership Experience Committee: Bobby Serda (Chair), Allison Knowlton (Vice-Chair) 
Service & Marketing Committee: Dave Patel (Chair), Isabelle Lindenmeyer (Vice-Chair) 
Alumni & Kiwanis Family Relations Committee: Natalie Knapp (Chair), TBD (Vice-Chair) 
Global Development Committee: Nicole Inocentes (Chair), TBD (Vice-Chair) 
Governing Documents and Finance Committee: Anthony Perez (Chair), TBD (Vice-Chair) 
Conventions Task Force: Allison Knowlton (Chair), TBD (Vice-Chair) 
Club Building Task Force: Ashley Rosen (Chair), TBD (Vice-Chair)

District and Club Boards 

District Boards provide support and guidance to the Circle K clubs within their geographical area.  All districts are headed by a Governor, who oversees the District Board members that often consist of a District Secretary, District Treasurer, District Editor, and Lieutenant Governors. Several Districts combine two District positions into a District Secretary/Treasurer. In place of Lieutenant Governors, a number of Districts have incorporated presidents Councils. District Conventions are held every year (in February or March depending on the District) for member education, club officer training, and election of the next District Board. Districts are charged with implementing International policies within their represented clubs and otherwise enhancing the member experience. All District Boards are responsible for club building, Kiwanis Family relations, laws and regulations, membership retention/education, and planning District events for the membership (e.g., District Convention).

Club Boards (also known as club officers or club Executive Boards) are an important aspect of CKI, second only to the club members, as they are the elected leaders who work within their community. Club Boards work with their District Boards on membership recruitment strategies, Kiwanis Family projects, membership retention and education, and social events.  Also, Club Boards plan community service projects and social events for their members. CKI recommends all clubs to elect their new Club Boards before their District Convention.

April 1 marks the CKI New Year each year, when club and district leadership transitions to newly elected officials.

Past international presidents 

A.  Mr. Creasy and Mr. Alford were president before a charter and separate constitution and by-laws were created for Circle K.

References

External links 
 Circle K International Official Site
 Individual club locator
 

Kiwanis
Student organizations in the United States
Organizations established in 1936
Service organizations based in the United States
Non-profit organizations based in Indianapolis